Mary Stuart or Mary Stewart may refer to:

People
Mary Stewart, Countess of Buchan (before 1428–1465), fifth daughter of James I of Scotland, 1st Countess of Buchan
Mary of Guelders (c. 1434–1463), queen to James II of Scotland
Mary Stewart, Countess of Arran (1453–1488), daughter of James II of Scotland
Mary of Guise (1515–1560), wife of James V of Scotland, mother of Mary, Queen of Scots
Mary, Queen of Scots (1542–1587), queen regnant of Scotland, wife of Francis II of France and mother of James I of England
Mary Stuart (1605–1607), daughter of James I of England
Mary Stewart, Duchess of Richmond (1622–1685), British aristocrat
Mary, Princess Royal and Princess of Orange (1631–1660), Princess Royal and Princess of Orange-Nassau, daughter of Charles I of England and mother of William III of England
Mary of Modena (1658–1718), wife of James II of Great Britain (VII of Scotland)
Mary II of England (1662–1694), co-ruler of England and Scotland with her husband William III from 1689 until her death
Mary Stuart, Countess of Bute (1718–1794), British peeress, wife of the British Prime Minister
Mary Stewart (social worker) (1862/3–1925), English social worker
Mary Stewart, Baroness Stewart of Alvechurch (1903–1984), English Labour politician and educator
Mary Stewart (novelist) (1916–2014), British novelist
Mary Stuart (actress) (1926–2002), American actress, best known for her 35-year role in the soap opera Search for Tomorrow
Mary Stewart (swimmer) (born 1945), Canadian swimmer
Mary Downie Stewart (1876–1957), New Zealand political hostess and welfare worker
Mary Stewart (athlete) (born 1956), British middle-distance runner
Mary Stewart, Viscountess Mountjoy (1654–1720)
Mary Stuart (academic) - Vice Chancellor of the University of Lincoln
Marie Stewart, Countess of Mar (died 1644), Scottish courtier

Works
Mary Stuart (play) (1800), a tragic play by Friedrich Schiller based on the life of Mary, Queen of Scots
Maria Stuarda (1835), a tragic opera by Gaetano Donizetti based on the play by Schiller
Marie Stuart (opera) (1844), opera by Louis Niedermeyer
Mary Stewart (play) (1951), anti-romantic five-act play in Scots by Robert McLellan depicting the Queen's downfall in the months between March 1566 and June 1577
Mary Stuart (film), a 1927 German silent historical film

See also
Mary Stuart Gile (1936-2019), American politician
Mary Stuart Masterson (born 1966), American actress

Stuart, Mary